South Wirral High School is a coeducational foundation secondary school and sixth form located in Eastham, Merseyside, England. It has specialisms in Visual & Performing Arts alongside ICT & Computing.

History
South Wirral High School was established in 1985, by the merger of 'Eastham Secondary School' and 'Bromborough Secondary School'. It is situated on the former Eastham Secondary School site. Prior to being a high school, the site was a prisoner of war camp during the Second World War.

Facilities 
The school contains 2 large Sports Halls, Dance and Drama studios and 9 ICT suites. It has a SSAT Leading Edge status.

When the school became a Visual & Performing Arts College, a number of facilities were built or improved including a specialist 'VAPA Studio' often used for Performing Arts subjects and as a temporary Art Exhibition space to showcase GCSE and A Level students' work.

Notable former students
James Garner (footballer, born 2001)

References

Secondary schools in the Metropolitan Borough of Wirral
Educational institutions established in 1969
1969 establishments in England
Foundation schools in the Metropolitan Borough of Wirral